Alpine skiing at the 1980 Winter Paralympics consisted of 22 events, 12 for men and 10 for women.

Medal table

Medal summary 
The competition events were:

Giant slalom: men - women
Slalom: men - women

Each event had separate standing classifications:

1A - standing: single leg amputation above the knee
2A - standing: single leg amputation below the knee
2B - standing: double leg amputation below the knee, mild cerebral palsy, or equivalent impairment
3A - standing: single arm amputation
3B - standing: double arm amputation
4 - standing: amputation of one arm and one leg

Men's events

Women's events

See also
Alpine skiing at the 1980 Winter Olympics

References 

 

 

 IPC Historical Results Database, International Paralympic Committee (IPC)
 Winter Sport Classification, Canadian Paralympic Committee

1980 Winter Paralympics events
1980
Paralympics